La Haie-Fouassière (also spelled: La Haye-Fouassière,) is a commune in the Loire-Atlantique department in western France. La Haie-Fouassière station has rail connections to Clisson and Nantes.

Population

See also
Communes of the Loire-Atlantique department

References

Communes of Loire-Atlantique